Camilo Olaviano Osías, Sr. (born Camilo Osías y Olaviano; March 23, 1889 – May 20, 1976) was a Filipino politician, twice for a short time President of the Senate of the Philippines. Along with a certain American named Mary A. Lane, Osías translated into English the poem Filipinas that was set to the Marcha Nacional Filipina, producing the Philippine Hymn that is now the national anthem, Lupang Hinirang.

Life and career
Osías attended school in Balaoan, Vigan and San Fernando, and was selected a government scholar to the United States in 1905. He studied at the University of Chicago in 1906 and 1907. He graduated from the Western Illinois State Teachers College at Macomb, Illinois in 1908, and from the Teachers College of Columbia University in New York City in 1910. 

On his return to the Philippines, he taught and later assumed various administrative positions, particularly in the field of education. He successively became the first Filipino Superintendent of Schools (1915 to 1916), Assistant Director of Education (1917 to 1921), a lecturer at the University of the Philippines (1919 to 1921), and President of National University (1921–1936), a private institution.

Osías then entered national politics. He was a member of the first Philippine mission to the United States (1919 to 1920). He was elected to the Philippine Senate in 1925, and as a Nacionalista, was Resident Commissioner in the United States House of Representatives in 1928, reelected in 1931 and served from March 4, 1929 until January 3, 1935, when his term expired in accordance with the new government of the Philippine Commonwealth. In 1934, he was an unsuccessful candidate for election to the Philippine Senate, but became a member of the Constitutional Convention in 1934, and a member of the first National Assembly in 1935. In 1939, he was a member of the Economic Mission to the United States, and chairman of the Educational Mission between 1938 and 1941.

Back in the Philippines, Osías became chairman of the National Council of Education in 1941, Director of Publicity and Propaganda until January 1942, chairman of the National Cooperative Administration in 1941, later Assistant Commissioner of the Department of Education, Health, and Public Welfare, then Secretary of Education until 1945. He was also Chancellor of Osías Colleges. He was elected again to the Philippine Senate in 1947 for a term expiring in 1953. He was President of the Senate of the Philippines twice for a short time in 1952 and in 1953. He was the Philippines' representative to the Inter-Parliamentary Union in Rome and to the International Trade Conference in Genoa in 1948. He ran as a Nacionalista again, this time for President of the Philippines, in 1953 and lost to Ramón Magsaysay. He was again elected, this time as a Liberal to the Philippine Senate (1961–1967), and served as president pro tempore. He was a resident of Mandaluyong, Rizal (since incorporated into Metro Manila), until his death.

Bibliography
Camilo Osías: The Story of a Long Career of Varied Tasks (Manlapaz Publishing Co., Quezon City, 1971)
Eduardo Bananal: Camilo Osías: Educator and Statesman (Manlapaz Publishing Co., Quezon City, 1974)
Camilo Osia (sic) in Hispanic Americans in Congress, 1822-1995, prepared under the direction of the Joint Committee on Printing by Carmen E. Enciso and Tracy North, Hispanic Division, Library of Congress (Government Printing Office, Washington, 1995)

See also
List of Asian Americans and Pacific Islands Americans in the United States Congress
Resident Commissioner of the Philippines

External links

1889 births
1976 deaths
Filipino collaborators with Imperial Japan
Filipino Methodists
Ilocano people
Filipino Protestants
Laurel administration cabinet members
Liberal Party (Philippines) politicians
Members of the House of Representatives of the Philippines from La Union
Members of the United States Congress of Filipino descent
Nacionalista Party politicians
People from La Union
Filipino Freemasons
Presidents of the Senate of the Philippines
Quezon administration personnel
Resident Commissioners of the Philippines
Secretaries of Education of the Philippines
Senators of the 1st Congress of the Philippines
Senators of the 2nd Congress of the Philippines
Senators of the 5th Congress of the Philippines
Senators of the 6th Congress of the Philippines
Senators of the 7th Philippine Legislature
Senators of the 8th Philippine Legislature
Teachers College, Columbia University alumni
Western Illinois University alumni
Members of the National Assembly of the Philippines
KALIBAPI politicians
Burials at the Loyola Memorial Park
Filipino expatriates in the United States